Dame Lynda Bethridge Topp (born 14 May 1958), is one half of the Topp Twins, a music comedy duo of New Zealand, the other member being her twin sister Jools Topp. Lynda Topp has been singing and entertaining with her sister for decades, touring live music and comedy performances as well as TV and film. Both sisters were appointed Dames Companion of the New Zealand Order of Merit in the 2018 Queen's Birthday Honours.

Background and personal life 
On 14 May 1958, Jean Topp gave birth to twin sisters Lynda and Jools in Huntly, New Zealand. They have an older brother Bruce and their father is Peter. Lynda Topp grew up with her family on a dairy farm in Waikato. Topp attended Ruawaro Combined School during the 1960s and early 1970s. Lynda and Jools started singing together for other people when they were five years old, when they were nine their brother bought them a guitar from money he had saved up.

After leaving school in 1976, Jools and Lynda Topp joined the New Zealand Territorial Force and were posted at the Burnham Military Camp near Christchurch for six weeks. When they were 17, they performed at the Victorian Coffee Lounge (Montreal Street, Christchurch Central City). This brought them into contact with radical lesbian feminists. They both started identifying as lesbian from the late 1970s. Much of their life has been in the public eye and their mother was interviewed by Radio New Zealand about the closure of the Women's Weekly magazine in 2020 talking about how much her children had been featured in these magazines.

Lynda enjoys hunting and fly fishing, which is why she chose to live in the South Island of New Zealand. Lynda has done many things in addition to being an entertainer, including running a café with her partner Donna in Methven, Canterbury. In March 2013, Lynda married her long-time partner Donna Luxton, a preschool teacher. At the time of their marriage, same-sex marriage was not legal in New Zealand, so the couple entered into a civil union as a substitute for marriage. Same-sex marriage was made legal in New Zealand just a few months after the wedding.

On the birth of a new generation with Lynda being a grandparent and Jools being a grand aunt they admitted they didn't expect it when they were younger because as they said: "We're all gay", referring also to their brother. Both Lynda and Jools Topp use their celebrity status with humour to inform people of issues such as feminism, Māori land rights, homosexual law reform and nuclear free and have been recognised by the LGBT community as being inspirational.

Marriage (Definition of Marriage) Amendment Bill 
Before the third reading of the Marriage (Definition of Marriage) Amendment Bill, which ultimately passed and legalised same-sex marriage in New Zealand, the Topp Twins publicly endorsed the bill in a post on their website. In a statement, Lynda said:Everybody should be able to stand up and say "I'm getting married". A Civil Union is demeaning, this idea that you will never be good enough, that your love is somehow less than or not as worthy. There's no romance to it. And today, I feel more romantic and more in love than I've ever felt in my life.

Breast cancer 
In March 2022 Lynda and Jools revealed that they had both been diagnosed with breast cancer in 2021.

Local politics 
Lynda Topp is seeking election to Ashburton District Council in the 2022 local elections.

Career 

Lynda Topp along with her sister Jools has had a long career in entertainment in New Zealand. They sing country and folk music with harmonies often to raise people's social consciousness. As entertainers Lynda Topp leads the comedy and "works the audience", and mostly Jools plays the guitar and leads the song making. Lynda focused on yodelling. The Topp Twins' popularity arose from a regular stint busking in Auckland when they were in their early 20s. They got taken to court for causing obstruction on Queen Street because their crowd was too big. They won the case and benefited from the publicity. Soon after that they travelled  and performed to university crowds around New Zealand. They are well known for their costumed comedic characters such as Ken & Ken, and Camp Leader and Camp Mother. They have been a lot on TV in character including in 2000 hosting a quiz show called Mr and Mrs, in which couples answered questions about how well they knew each other, and a 2014 to 2016 cooking show called Topp Country.

Awards 
1987 Listener Film and Television Awards. Best Entertainer: Topp Twins
1987 Listener Film and Television Awards. Best Entertainment Programme: Topp Twins Special
1987 Listener Film and Television Awards. Best Original Music: Topp Twins Special
1997 TV Guide Television Awards. Best Performance in an Entertainment Programme (shared with Lynda Topp): for Topp Twins, Do Not Adjust Your Twinset, episode 2
2004 New Zealand Order of Merit. (Shared with Lynda Topp) For Services to Entertainment
2009 Melbourne Film Festival. Audience Award for Documentary: The Topp Twins: Untouchable Girls
2009 Qantas Film and Television Awards. Best Feature Film – Under $1 Million: The Topp Twins: Untouchable Girls
2009 Qantas Film and Television Awards. Original Music (shared with Lynda Topp): for The Topp Twins: Untouchable Girls
2009 Toronto International Film Festival. Audience Award for Documentary: The Topp Twins: Untouchable Girls
2010 Brattleboro Film Festival (United States). Best of Festival Award: The Topp Twins: Untouchable Girls
2010 FIFO Oceanian International Documentary Film Festival (Tahiti). Special Jury Award: The Topp Twins: Untouchable Girls
2010 Gothenburg International Film Festival (Sweden). Audience Dragon Award for Best Feature Film: The Topp Twins: Untouchable Girls
2010 Portland International Film Festival. Best Feature Documentary: The Topp Twins: Untouchable Girls
2010 Qantas Film and Television Awards. Best Entertainment Programme: The Topp Twins and The APO
2017 New Zealand Television Awards. Best Presenter – Entertainment (shared with Lynda Topp): for Topp Country, season two
2018 Dame Companion of the New Zealand Order of Merit for services to entertainment
2019 Lifetime Achievement Award at the NEXT Woman of the Year Awards

Aotearoa Music Awards
The Aotearoa Music Awards (previously known as New Zealand Music Awards (NZMA)) are an annual awards night celebrating excellence in New Zealand music and have been presented annually since 1965.

! 
|-
| 2008 || Lynda Topp (as part of Topp Twins) || New Zealand Music Hall of Fame ||  || 
|-

Screenography 
Give us a clue. 2021, As: Ken – Television
Wellington Paranormal – Covid-19. 2020, As: Mrs O'Leary – Web
 Funny As: The Story of New Zealand Comedy. 2019, Subject – Television
 Funny As: The Story of New Zealand Comedy (series promo). 2019, Subject – Television
 Wellington Paranormal. 2019, As: Officer O'Leary's Mum – Television
 Poi E: The Story of Our Song. 2016, Subject – Film
 Topp Country. 2014 – 2016, Presenter – Television
 The Topp Twins and the APO. 2010, Presenter, Presenter – Television
 The Topp Twins: – Untouchable Girls. 2009, Subject – Film
 Ken's Hunting and Fishing Show. 2007, Director, As: Ken Moller – Television
 Ken's Hunting and Fishing Show – Tongariro. 2007, As: Ken Moller, Director – Television
 The Adventures of Roman Pilgrim. 2005, As: One of the Fates – Short Film
 Mr and Mrs. 2000, Presenter – Television
 In Search of the Lonesome Yodel. 2000, Presenter – Television
 The Topp Twins – Highland Games. 2000, Performer, Writer, Producer – Television
 The Topp Twins – Speedway. 1998, Performer, Writer, Producer – Television
 1998 Hero Parade. 1998, Subject – Television
 Destination Planet Earth. 1997 – 1998, Subject – Television
 Highwater. 1997, As: Marge – Television
 The Topp Twins. 1996 – 2000, Writer, Musician, Producer – Television
 The Topp Twins – The Beach. 1996, Performer, Writer, Producer – Television
 The Topp Twins: Do Not Adjust Your Twinset. 1996, Presenter – Television
 Beyond a Joke!. 1995, Subject – Television
 The People Next Door. 1994, Subject – Television
 Camping Out with the Topp Twins. 1993, Musician – Television
 Rivers of NZ. 1992, Subject – Television
 Great New Zealand River Journeys. 1991, Presenter – Television
 Topp Twins TV Special. 1986, Musician
 That's Country. 1980 – 1984, Performer – Television

Books 
2018 Topp Country: A Culinary Journey Through New Zealand with the Topp Twins by Jools Topp and Linda Topp  Hardcover (New Zealand)

She has also released five best-selling children’s audio books.

Discography 

The Topp Twins have released a number of vinyls, tapes, and CDs.

References

External links 

 
 Topp Twins TV show on NZ On Screen.
 
 
 You Tube Channel

1958 births
Living people
APRA Award winners
Lesbian singers
Lesbian comedians
New Zealand lesbian musicians
Yodelers
People from Huntly, New Zealand
New Zealand women comedians
Dames Companion of the New Zealand Order of Merit
Twin musicians
New Zealand LGBT singers
New Zealand LGBT comedians
Singers awarded knighthoods